The Road to Red is the third of the major box set releases from English progressive rock group King Crimson, released in 2013 by Discipline Global Mobile & Panegyric Records.

Whilst the focus of this release is the Red studio album, it is just one of 24 discs featuring live concert material from 1974, including the majority of King Crimson's US tour from that year.

Over 21 audio CDs, 1 DVD, 2 Blu-ray Discs, copious sleeve notes and replica memorabilia, The Road to Red captures the process leading to one of the band's most important albums, and what would be their final work for seven years.

A total of 16 complete concerts are featured across 20 discs, with a new 2013 Steven Wilson and Robert Fripp stereo mix of Red as the 21st CD. 

2 album prints, a 36 page album sized booklet with rare photos, eye witness accounts of the concerts and sleevenotes incorporating new interviews with John Wetton, Bill Bruford, David Cross and others,  plus postcards and other memorabilia.

Track listing

References

External links 

 

King Crimson albums
2013 albums
Discipline Global Mobile albums